Horace Mann Thu-Jaune (born December 20, 1963 in Farafangana) is a Malagasy politician.  He is a member of the Senate of Madagascar for Atsinanana, and is a member of the Tiako I Madagasikara party.

References

1963 births
Living people
Members of the Senate (Madagascar)
Tiako I Madagasikara politicians